Olena Vitaliyivna Kravatska (born 22 June 1992) is a Ukrainian sabre fencer. Competing in team events, she is the 2015 World silver medalist and 2016 Olympic silver medalist.

Career
Kravatska won a silver medal in the 2010 Junior European Championships and a team gold medal the same year in the Junior World Championships.

In the 2013–14 season she took part in her first major competition amongst seniors. At the European Championships in Strasbourg, she ranked 2nd after the pools and received a bye. She was then defeated in the table of 32 by Germany's Sibylle Klemm and finished 17th. At the World Championships in Kazan, she was defeated in the table of 64 by Olympic silver medal Sofiya Velikaya. In the team event, she was selected as reserve into the Ukrainian team. They defeated first Japan, then South Korea before falling 44–45 to the United States. Ukraine overcame Italy in the small final to earn a bronze medal.

In the 2014–15 season Kravatska climbed her first World Cup with a bronze medal in the Orléans World Cup.

References

External links
 Profile at the European Fencing Confederation

1992 births
Living people
Armed Forces sports society (Ukraine) athletes
Ukrainian female sabre fencers
Fencers at the 2015 European Games
European Games medalists in fencing
European Games gold medalists for Ukraine
Fencers at the 2016 Summer Olympics
Olympic fencers of Ukraine
Medalists at the 2016 Summer Olympics
Olympic silver medalists for Ukraine
Olympic medalists in fencing
Sportspeople from Chernivtsi
20th-century Ukrainian women
21st-century Ukrainian women